Carbondale is a hamlet in central Alberta, Canada within Sturgeon County.

Carbondale was so named on account of coal mines near the original town site; coal is a carbon-based fuel.

Carbondale is the original site of Carbondale Rail Station (1913-1959).

Demographics 

See also 
List of communities in Alberta
List of designated places in Alberta
List of hamlets in Alberta

References 

5. https://www.stalberttoday.ca/local-news/carbondale-resident-uncovers-historic-tragedy-in-backyard-1852026

Hamlets in Alberta
Designated places in Alberta
Sturgeon County